Kaiserliche Werft Wilhelmshaven (Wilhelmshaven Imperial Shipyard) was a German shipbuilding company in Wilhelmshaven, founded in 1871 and closed in 1918.  Together with Kaiserliche Werft Danzig and Kaiserliche Werft Kiel it was one of three shipyards which solely produced warships for the Preußische Marine and the following German Kaiserliche Marine. With the end of World War I all three imperial shipyards were closed, but the Wilhelmshaven shipyard was reopened in 1919, first as Reichsmarinewerft Wilhelmshaven, and after 1935 named Kriegsmarinewerft Wilhelmshaven.

History 
Kaiserliche Werft Wilhelmshaven was a German shipbuilding company in Wilhelmshaven, a coastal town in Lower Saxony - North Germany - on the western side of the Jade Bight, a bay of the North Sea.

The predecessor of the Kaiserliche Werft was founded 1853 under an agreement of the Grand Duchy of Oldenburg and the Kingdom of Prussia.  The object of this agreement was a protection of  Oldenburg's merchant fleet by Prussian navy on the one hand, on the other to enlarge the Prussian sphere of influence in the western part of Germany.  When the Jade Treaty was signed about 3.10 km² of Oldenburgian territory at the Jade Bight was ceded to Prussia.

The first years the naval base was only used as an arsenal, depot and repair facility for the developing Prussian fleet.  Building up of necessary harbours, slipways, dockyards, workshops, etc. followed some years later.

After the Prussian victory over Austria in the 1866 Austro-Prussian War, the North German Confederation was founded and the shipyard was handed over from Prussia to this new confederation.  The shipyard was officially opened 1869 by the Prussian King Wilhelm I. First known as Königliche Werft, the shipyard was now named Marinewerft des Norddeutschen Bundes (Naval Shipyard of the North German Confederation). With the proclamation of the German Empire in 1871 it received the final name Kaiserliche Werft Wilhelmshaven.

Forced by the needs of the rapidly growing German imperial navy it became necessary to enlarge shipbuilding capacities. Under the reign of Kaiser Wilhelm II and his fleet commander Grand Admiral Alfred von Tirpitz the shipyard was immediately extended.  It soon became the greatest and most important of the three German imperial shipyards, beginning with about 3000 co-workers in 1880 and at last about 21,000 end of 1918, capable to build the largest and strongest warships of that time.

With the end of World War I the shipyard was closed for a short time, after that it was opened again, now named Reichsmarinewerft Wilhelmshaven and at last, some years later Kriegsmarinewerft Wilhelmshaven.

 Ships built by Kaiserliche Werft  with laid down/commissioned data (selection):
 1859/1873, Aviso , first ship of the Kaiserliche Werft (Serial No. 1)
 1874/1878,  
 1876/1879, Gunboats  and 
 1883/1886, Steam corvette 
 1887/1889, s  and 
 1890/1894,  pre-dreadnought battleship 
 1891/1893,  
 1893/1895,  
 1895/1898,  pre-dreadnought battleship 
 1896/1900,  pre-dreadnought battleship 
 1899/1902,  pre-dreadnought battleship 
 1900/1904,  pre-dreadnought battleship  
 1904/1907, Deutschland-class pre-dreadnought battleship 
 1907/1909,  
 1908/1911,  
 1910/1912,  light cruiser 
 1911/1914,  
 1913/1917,  
 1915/----,   Serial No. 35, Ersatz A, construction stopped after launching, broken up 1922
 1917/----, Conversion of 7 merchant-submarines to cruiser U-boats, including  to

Aircraft 
 Kaiserliche Werft Wilhelmshaven 401
 Kaiserliche Werft Wilhelmshaven 461
 Kaiserliche Werft Wilhelmshaven 945
 Kaiserliche Werft Wilhelmshaven 947

References 

 G. Koop, K. Galle, F. Klein, Von der Kaiserlichen Werft zum Marinearsenal, Bernard & Graefe Verlag München, 1982, 
 H. J. Hansen, Die Schiffe der deutschen Flotten 1848 – 1945, Verlag Gerhard Stalling AG, Oldenburg 1973, 

Shipbuilding companies of Germany
Companies of Prussia
Defunct manufacturing companies of Germany
Wilhelmshaven
Manufacturing companies established in 1853
Manufacturing companies disestablished in 1918
1853 establishments in Germany
1918 disestablishments in Germany